Probithia is a genus of moths in the family Geometridae.

Species
Probithia exclusa (Walker, 1860) north-eastern Himalayas, Philippines, Sulawesi
Probithia imprimata (Walker, 1861) Borneo, Peninsular Malaysia, Sumatra
Probithia obstataria (Walker, 1861) Australia
Probithia perichila (Prout, 1929) Australia, Sulawesi

References

Geometridae